This article is about the list of Estrela Clube Primeiro de Maio players. Estrela Clube Primeiro de Maio is an Angolan football (soccer) club based in Benguela, Angola and plays at Estádio Municipal Edelfride Palhares da Costa.  The club was established in 1981.

2011–2020
Estrela Clube Primeiro de Maio players 2011–2020

2001–2010
Estrela Clube Primeiro de Maio players 2001–2010

1991–2000
Estrela Clube Primeiro de Maio players 1991–2000

1981–1990
Estrela Clube Primeiro de Maio players 1981–1990

External links
 Blog
 Facebook profile
 Girabola.com profile
 Zerozero.pt profile
 Match details

References

Primeiro de Maio
Estrela Clube Primeiro de Maio players
Association football player non-biographical articles